Puerto Rico currently has the fourth-most active players in Major League Baseball (MLB) among Latin American jurisdictions, behind the Dominican Republic, Venezuela and Cuba. More than three hundred players from the archipelago have played in the major leagues since . This includes players who were born in either one of the archipelago's islands and those of Puerto Rican heritage. Only those players who have worked in the major leagues are listed, not those active in the minor leagues, nor negro independent leagues.

For years, it was considered that the first player from Puerto Rico to play in the major leagues was Hiram Bithorn. But this changed on December 16, 2020, when seven negro baseball leagues were finally classified as major or big leagues, only for the periods between 1920 and 1948. Thus, the first Puerto Rican to play baseball on the major leagues was Jose "Gacho" Torres. Then, after the baseball color line was abandoned following Jackie Robinson's debut in the National League of the MLB, more players from the island signed contracts. This led to an improvement in their performance, and some of them were selected to participate in the Major League Baseball All-Star Game. Including their names in the Major League Baseball draft is a requisite for first-year players born in Puerto Rico, because the league recognizes the island as a jurisdiction within the United States. Following the implementation of this measure, Puerto Rico's government requested exclusion from the draft and help to develop players, in order to reduce the impact of the change in the format of talent development.

Historical performance and regulations
Baseball was introduced to Puerto Rico by immigrants during the nineteenth century. The first sanctioned baseball game in the island was played on January 9, 1898, in Santurce, Puerto Rico, where two teams composed of Puerto Rican, American and Cuban players participated. After this game, baseball became a widespread sport and professional and amateur leagues were organized. During this time period, the Puerto Rico national teams experienced success on international competition and Afro-Puerto Rican players began to participate in the Negro leagues.

Hiram Bithorn debuted as a pitcher with the Chicago Cubs on April 15, 1942, but before him, there were about 10 other players who worked on the negro leagues, now considered as major leagues. About 17 other Puerto Rican players in the negro leagues were active right before the introduction of African American players in Major League Baseball, and thus, there were more chances to players born in the island. Subsequently, Afro-Puerto Rican players such as Orlando Cepeda and Victor Pellot Power began having solid performances in the league, and were selected to participate in the Major League Baseball All-Star Game. In , Roberto Clemente became the first player from Puerto Rico and first Latin American to be elected as a member of the National Baseball Hall of Fame and Museum. Since then Puerto Rico has kept a stable number of players in the league. During this timeframe, several players have been selected to participate in the All-Star Game or won awards for their performance, while others imposed records within the league. These include Javy López, who holds the record for most home runs hit by a catcher in a single season. Both Iván Rodríguez and Roberto Alomar hold the record for most Gold Glove Awards in their positions. Recipients of the Most Valuable Player Award include Orlando Cepeda, Juan González and Iván Rodríguez. Roberto Clemente and Mike Lowell also won the World Series MVP Award in their respective divisions. Carlos Delgado is the only Latin to hit 4 homers in a game.

Originally, players who were either born or naturalized in Puerto Rico were able to sign with MLB teams as free agents, usually receiving minor-league contracts prior to their debut in the league. In , Major League Baseball decided to include the island in the list of jurisdictions within the United States, which made mandatory that first-year players include their name in the Major League Baseball Draft in order to receive a contract. This was based on an initiative that was supposed to create a national and international drafting system. The change reduced the number of players that were able to participate in the league, by limiting the number of them selected by the teams;  this led to the island's Secretary of Recreation and Sports, to formally ask to Major League's involvement in developing specialized schools to produce more players and other measures to reduce the impact of the draft's implementation. The original proposal included Puerto Rico's exclusion of the draft for a period of ten years, but this was not approved by the league.

Puerto Rico was one of sixteen teams to participate in the inaugural edition of the World Baseball Classic. The tournament was created by Major League Baseball, the Major League Baseball Players Association, and other professional baseball leagues and their players associations around the world, including the Puerto Rican Professional Baseball League. The first event was organized in 2006, and was sanctioned by the International Baseball Federation. Puerto Rico won the silver medal on both 2013 and 2017 classics. During the series there was an average attendance of 14,222.

List of players
This includes 22 baseball players from Puerto Rico (plus 2 of them unknown) that played in the Negro Leagues for the period between 1920 to 1948 and another 368 in the American or National League from 1942 to the present day, for a total of 392 players. It is important to mention that some players from the negro leagues are not included in the list because they are still under research, since no evidence has been found so far of any participation in at least a single game in an organized baseball league. While 303 players were born on the island, plus the 2 negro leaguers unknown (Pérez and Villafañe), the list also includes players born on the mainland US or its territories to Puerto Rican parents (both or one of them) or that have grandparents from Puerto Rico. Also, the list includes Puerto Rican players with Dominican, Cuban or other countries heritage. Puerto Ricans typically consider the diaspora as their own.

A–E

F–L

M–Q

R–W

Other players related to Puerto Rico but not included in the list 
The following baseball players were not considered for the official list of Puerto Ricans in Major Leagues:
 Guillermo Angulo- When he played for the 1929 Pelayo Chacon's Stars of Cuba, this was an Independent Barnstorming (road) team and not affiliated to any official negro league.
 Joe Arroyo (pitcher)- This 1938 Cuban Stars pitcher is still on-going research. 
 Tomás "Añil" Bonilla- According to historians, he played as a catcher for the Philadelphia Stars in 1949. Not eligible for this year the league were not recognized as major.
 Alex Bregman- Fluently speaking in Spanish, the Houston Astros star told the press his interest in playing for Puerto Rico for the World Baseball Classic, yet is not eligible due to only his grandmother's spouse is Puerto Rican.
 José Antonio Burgos- Played for the Birmingham Black Barons of the Negro American League, but played in 1949, a period not eligible to be considered as a major league.
 Triston Casas- Made his debut for the Boston Red Sox in 2022. His great grandmother is Puerto Rican. 
 Pedro Cepeda- One of the most powerful Puerto Rican baseball players ever, Perucho was included in the 1940's New York Cubans roster, but refused to debut.
 Gabriel Cancel- Infielder activated by Kansas City Royals in 2022 as a part of the practice squad or "taxi squad", a concept used to replace players in COVID-19 emergency times. No major league debut for him so far.
 Rafael Concepción (Fellito)- He was Monchile's brother. According to Seamheads.com, he played shortstop for the 1937 Cuban Stars East 2, an independent negro leagues baseball club.
 Roberto Concepción Covas- An extraordinary all-around Puerto Rican player in the 1930's Negro leagues, but played for independent clubs which make him not eligible. However, he does not appear in any baseball reference site, so he is still on research until further data becomes available.
 Coco Crisp- According to some notes, his father is from Italian and Puerto Rican descent. 
 Rafael Cruz- May be "Tunito" was the first Puerto Rican to work in the Negro Leagues when he pitched for Pelayo Chacon's Cuban Stars (East) in 1918 and possibly until 1920. But, for those years the team was still competing in the Eastern Independent Clubs. Therefore, he is not classified as a major league player.
 Edwin Encarnación- Dominican baseball player whose teen years were spent in Puerto Rico, where he learned to play the sport and lived for five years. Not eligible.
 Francisco Faberlle- Not too much information about him. Nicknamed "Ciqui", he is still under on-going research about any plate appearance with the short-lived 1926 Newark Stars.
 Mychal Givens- Relief pitcher of Puerto Rican great-grandmother. Not eligible, but PR Team for the WBC was interested in his services, if any consideration. 
 Gianpaul González- Was ascended for the 2021 Cleveland Indians big team as part of a "taxi squad", but never played. Did not officially debut in MLB.
 Ramon Guilfucci- Some Puerto Rican historians presented evidence of his participation with the 1925 Philadelphia Giants (an independent team by then), but also is under on-going research about any plate appearance with the short-lived 1926 Newark Stars.
 Reggie Jackson- MLB included him on 2012 All Time Latino Team since his grandmother was Puerto Rican according to some media. Reggie is still alive, yet has not provided enough data.
 Armando Moreno- Though in uniform for two days for the 1990 Pittsburgh Pirates, Moreno did not officially debut in MLB.
 Noel Oquendo- Played in the minor leagues, but no evidence of any major negro league activity.
 Julio Ortiz Arango- Larry Lester's Negro Leagues book billed him as Bill Ortiz, playing for the 1945 Indy Clowns, but still no evidence that he ever played a game. Other names used were Bill Ortie and William Ortiz.
 Tony Pérez- Puerto Rican by "adoption", HOF Atanasio "Tany" Pérez was born in Cuba and is the father of Eduardo Pérez, of Puerto Rican mother.
 Andrés Pulliza- This left handed pitcher made his negro minor league debut in 1947. There is no evidence about any participation with the 1947 Atlanta Black Crackers.
 Nenene Rivera- Aniceto Rivera played for the Pollock's Cuban Stars in 1933. Specifically for that year, the team was an independent club, not affiliated to the East-West Negro League, therefore he is not eligible.
 Pedro Ramírez- Not too much information about this pitcher, only that he played for the 1934 Cubans Stars East as an independent team. Appears at Seamheads.com only as "Ramirez".
 Gerardo Rodríguez- Played as pitcher in the minor leagues, yet no evidence of any appearance with the 1944 New York Cubans other than a book called Puente Roto.
 Néstor Sabater- An outfielder named Nestor S. appears in the appendix of the book "Only the Ball was White" by Robert Peterson. Also, according to newspapers from Puerto Rico, he appears in some pictures wearing the 1926 Lincoln Giants uniform. Another photo shows him with the short lived Newark Stars (1926). If he had some participation with those teams, it's still under research, according to baseball historians Jorge Colón Delgado and Gary Ashwill. The Negro League book by Clark and Lester mentions an outfielder named Jace S. Nestor with the 1926 Lincoln Giants, while Ashwill made some notes on Agate Type webpage about a player with the same name mentioned when the Newark Stars were scouting in Puerto Rico. It is not sure if it is the same player.
 José "Pepe" Santana- On-going research. According to some notes, Pepe played as first baseman with 1925 Philadelphia Giants, then an independent team.
 Juan "Camarón" Sosa- Not too much information about him. Still under on-going research about any plate appearance with the short-lived 1926 Newark Stars.
 Francisco Sostre- According to some media, Sostre was included on 1947 New York Cubans roster, but not enough data to confirm that he officially debuted.
 Giancarlo Stanton- Puerto Rican great-grandmother, not eligible for the official list.
 Tetelo Vargas- Born in Dominican Republic, Juan Esteban Vargas was an idol in every place he played, including the Puerto Rican winter baseball league, where he played for many years. Puerto Rico was so special for him, that he decided to marry and live his late years in the island. He was even buried in Guayama, PR, but still not eligible.
 José Luis Velázquez- Played with Indianapolis Clowns in 1948. According to several sources, a pitcher named José Velásquez from Cuba, participated in one official game, though some local Indiana newspapers says he was Puerto Rican. Also, it looks that he has been mistaken with another great pitcher from Puerto Rico named Manuel Laru Velázquez. Both played in the Puerto Rican baseball league.
 Ozzie Virgil Sr.- Born in Dominican Republic, SOME EXPERTS INCLUDE HIM IN THE OFFICIAL LIST, since he lived in PR for more than 12 years, was active in the local league and his son Ozzie Jr. was born in Puerto Rico.

Players mistaken as Puerto Ricans or major leaguers 
Rafael Cuebas Quintana- Mistaken with Cuban Rafael Busta Quintana.
Carlos Diaz- 1990s Toronto Blue Jays catcher of Cuban heritage. Mistaken as Puerto Rican in some websites.
Pedro "Jíbaro" Diaz- Apparently was mistaken with Cuban Pedro Díaz.
Jarren Duran- Before his debut with the Boston Red Sox in 2021, he was sent to the Puerto Rican Winter League and also played during the Caribbean Baseball Series representing Puerto Rico, but his parents are from Mexico.
Danny Garcia-1981 KC Royals outfielder. Although he played in Puerto Rican Winter League, Brooklyn's native has no Puerto Rican roots.
Willis Otañez- Dominican player who may be was mistakenly placed as a Puerto Rican in some baseball trading cards, since he was born in La Vega Baja,DR, not Vega Baja,PR.
Manuel Larú Velázquez- This Coamo, PR pitcher apparently has been mistaken with Cuban pitcher Jose Luis Larú Velázquez, who is also on research, due to some media calling him "boricua".

See also 
 List of current Major League Baseball players by nationality
Chicago White Sox

References

External links 
 
 
 

 
Puerto
Baseball